Mustafa İnan (1911 in Adana – 1967 in Freiburg) was a Turkish civil engineering academic.

Life
He was born in Adana. His mother was Rabia and father was Hüseyin Avni. At the end of the First World War Adana was occupied by the French forces and his family had to move to Konya. At the end of the Turkish War of Independence the family returned to Adana and Mustafa continued his secondary education in Adana.  In 1931 he took the first place in the entrance examinations of the Istanbul Technical University (then known as Engineering School) . Later he was sent to Switzerland for advanced studies in the ETH Zurich (Eidgenössische Technische). After his doctorate thesis 1941, he returned to Turkey to continue academic studies in the Engineering School. In 1944, the school was renamed Istanbul Technical University and he became the associate professor of Mechanics and Strength .
After compulsory military  service in 1944, he married Jale İnan, the first female archaeologist in Turkey. 
In 1945,  he became the professor, in 1954 -1957 term he became the dean of the Civil engineering faculty and in 1957–1959 term  the rector of the university. In 1963, he was elected as a member of the science committee of the Scientific and Technological Research Council of Turkey (known as TUBİTAK)  Later he became the chairman of the committee. On 5 August 1967 he died in Freiburg, Germany.Five days later, following a ceremony in the university, he was buried in the Zincirlikuyu Cemetery in İstanbul.

Academic life
In 1943, he published his paper about Vrendel beams and this paper is considered as the very first Turkish engineering paper published in a foreign country. While in the university he established the first photoelasticity laboratory in Turkey in the early 1950s. In 1959–1964 term he published 11 papers. His paper of 1961 was about the carryover matrix was internationally one of the earliest papers on the subject. In 1962 he introduced the concept of computers to the university. He wrote four academic books and translated four others. (see the list below)

His field of study was wider than the civil engineering. One of his earliest papers was on the satellite trajectories. He also wrote an essay on the language-mathematic relations.

Awards and legacy
In 1957 during his deanship he was awarded the title Grand Ufficiale by the Italian government. After his death Tubitak awarded him in 1971. Tubitak also asked Oğuz Atay, a well known author and a student of İnan, to write a book about  İnan. The book titled Bir Blim Adamının Romanı ("The Novel of a Scientist") was published in 1975. 
A viaduct on the Ankara -İstanbul motor way is named after him as well as a library in the Istanbul Technical University.

Books and translations

Books
 1948:Elasto- Mekanikte Başlangıç Değerleri Metodu ve Taşıma Matrisi (The method of initial values and the carry-over matrix in elastomechanics )
 1966:Elastik Çubukların Genel Teorisi (General theory of elastic bars)
 1967:Cisimlerin Mukavemeti (Strength of materials)
 1969:Düzlemde Elastisite Teorisi (Plane theory of elasticity )- published after his death

Translations to Turkish
1948: Stephen Timoshenko:Strength of materials (Vol 1,2)
1950: Stephen Timoshenko:Elastic planes and shells
1950: Theodor Pöschl: Elementary Strength

References

1967 deaths
1911 births
Istanbul Technical University alumni
Academic staff of Istanbul Technical University
Rectors of Istanbul Technical University
Turkish engineering academics
ETH Zurich alumni
Scientific and Technological Research Council of Turkey
People from Adana
Burials at Zincirlikuyu Cemetery